Haiti sent a delegation to compete at the 2008 Summer Paralympics in Beijing, China. It was Haiti's first participation in the Paralympic Games. The country was represented by a single athlete, Nephtalie Jean-Louis, who competed in powerlifting. Jean-Louis was her country's flagbearer at the Games' Opening Ceremony.

Due to unspecified "problems with her weight", Jean-Louis was ultimately unable to compete, and was thus listed as a non-starter in her event.

Powerlifting

Women

See also
Haiti at the Paralympics
Haiti at the 2008 Summer Olympics

References

External links
International Paralympic Committee

Nations at the 2008 Summer Paralympics
2008
Summer Paralympics